Juki-ye Bizhan (also Romanized as Jūkī-ye Bīzhan; also known as Chūgī-ye Bīzhan and Jūgī-ye Bīzhan) is a village in Quri Chay-ye Gharbi Rural District, Saraju District, Maragheh County, East Azerbaijan Province, Iran. At the 2006 census, its population was 22, in 4 families.

References 

Towns and villages in Maragheh County